The murder of Frauke Liebs (February 21, 1985 – after June 27, 2006) is an unsolved criminal case in Germany.

Disappearance
On June 20, 2006 the 21-year-old student nurse Frauke Liebs disappeared under mysterious circumstances. The last known sighting of her was at a pub in Paderborn's city center, where she and a friend watched the FIFA World Cup match between England and Sweden. While Liebs was still at the pub, she borrowed a friend's mobile phone battery, as the battery on her own phone had been drained. She later returned her friend's battery before leaving the pub at around 11 p.m. Since she probably had no more than five Euro with her, she is believed to have been heading home on foot. The pub was about 1.5 kilometers away from her home.

At 12:49 a.m., her housemate received a text message from Liebs' mobile phone, saying that she would be home later. However, she did not return home that night, and when she also failed to appear at work the day after, her mother reported her missing. The police discovered that the text message had been sent from Nieheim, a small city about 35 km north-east of Paderborn.

In the following days, Liebs called her housemate five times via her mobile phone. Police were able to locate the calls, which all came from different industrial areas in Paderborn. During these calls, Liebs continued to say that she would return home soon, but did not communicate any information about her situation. She provided only vague or evasive answers to questions. Liebs' last phone call was on June 27 in the presence of her sister, who also talked to her. During this conversation, she is said to have answered the question of whether she was being held captive with a faint "yes", immediately followed by a loud "no". Contact broke off after this phone call.

Discovery and investigation
On October 4, 2006, Liebs' skeletonized body was found by a hunter in a forested area next to a Landesstraße ("state road") near Lichtenau. The body was found with the clothes she was wearing on the day of her disappearance. Her mobile phone, handbag, wallet and wrist watch were not found. Due to the condition of the body, the time and cause of Liebs' death could not be determined.

A case analysis by the police came to the conclusion that Liebs was probably held captive in the area around Nieheim and that the phone calls from Paderborn may have been diversionary maneuvers. No motive for the crime has been determined. Over 900 people who were connected to the victim were questioned by the police, and the initial investigation produced a list of five initial suspects. All five were eventually cleared after producing alibis.

The case aroused nationwide interest and was among others presented on the popular television show Aktenzeichen XY… ungelöst ("Case number XY … Unsolved").

See also 
 List of solved missing person cases
 List of unsolved murders

References

External links 
 Video clip from "Aktenzeichen XY ... ungelöst" (German)
 Video clip from TV show "Zeugen gesucht" (German)
 "True Crime Detective - Case: 1493/cs-w The kidnapping and murdering of 21-year old Frauke Liebs" (English)

2000s in North Rhine-Westphalia
2000s missing person cases
2006 murders in Germany
Female murder victims
Formerly missing people
Incidents of violence against women
Missing person cases in Germany
Murder in North Rhine-Westphalia
Unsolved murders in Germany
Violence against women in Germany